The 2016 Pocono Green 250 was the twelfth stock car race of the 2016 NASCAR Xfinity Series season, and the first iteration of the event. The race was held on Saturday, June 4, 2016, in Long Pond, Pennsylvania, at Pocono Raceway, a 2.5 miles (4.0 km) permanent triangular-shaped superspeedway. The race was decreased from 100 laps to 53 laps, due to inclement weather. Kyle Larson, driving for Chip Ganassi Racing, would take the win, after leading when the race got called due to persistent rain showers. This was Larson's 4th career NASCAR Xfinity Series win, and his first of the season. To fill out the podium, Erik Jones, driving for Joe Gibbs Racing, and Ty Dillon, driving for Richard Childress Racing, would finish second and third, respectively.

Background 

Pocono Raceway (formerly Pocono International Raceway), also known as The Tricky Triangle, is a superspeedway located in the Pocono Mountains in Long Pond, Pennsylvania. It is the site of three NASCAR national series races and an ARCA Menards Series event in July: a NASCAR Cup Series race with support events by the NASCAR Xfinity Series and NASCAR Camping World Truck Series. From 1971 to 1989, and from 2013 to 2019, the track also hosted an Indy Car race, currently sanctioned by the IndyCar Series. Additionally, from 1982 to 2021, it hosted two NASCAR Cup Series races, with the traditional first date being removed for 2022.

Pocono is one of the few NASCAR tracks not owned by either NASCAR or Speedway Motorsports, the dominant track owners in NASCAR. Pocono CEO Nick Igdalsky and president Ben May are members of the family-owned Mattco Inc, started by Joseph II and Rose Mattioli.  Mattco also owns South Boston Speedway in South Boston, Virginia.

Entry list 

 (R) denotes rookie driver.
 (i) denotes driver who is ineligible for series driver points.

Practice

First practice 
The first practice session was held on Thursday, June 2, at 2:00 PM EST. The session would last for 55 minutes.

Final practice 
The final practice session was held on Thursday, June 2, at 4:00 PM EST. The session would last for 55 minutes. Two more practice sessions were originally going to be held on Friday, June 3, but were both cancelled due to inclement weather.

Qualifying 
Qualifying was held on Saturday, June 4, at 9:05 AM EST. Since Pocono Raceway is at least , the qualifying system was a single car, single lap, two round system where in the first round, everyone would set a time to determine positions 13–40. Then, the fastest 12 qualifiers would move on to the second round to determine positions 1–12.

Full qualifying results

Race results

Standings after the race 

Drivers' Championship standings

Note: Only the first 12 positions are included for the driver standings.

References 

2016 NASCAR Xfinity Series
NASCAR races at Pocono Raceway
June 2016 sports events in the United States
2016 in sports in Pennsylvania